The Tuskar is a river in Kursk Oblast, Russia, and the third largest tributary of the Seym. Part of the greater Dnieper basin, the mouth of the river is located in the city of Kursk. The small river Kur is a tributary of the Tuskar in Kursk.

Rivers of Kursk Oblast